The Brenham Heritage Museum is a local history museum located in downtown Brenham, Texas. Exhibits and collections reflect a focus on the history and culture of the Brenham and Washington County area. The museum is located in the old US Post Office-Federal Building-Brenham, a National Register of Historic Places building. The museum operates a second site, the Bus Depot Gallery, in the Art-Deco Kerrville Bus Lines Depot of Brenham.

Origins
In 1991, the City of Brenham offered an historic building for use as a museum to the Brenham Heritage Museum, a non-profit organization in Brenham, Texas. A non-profit was established, some collections were acquired, funds were raised and the museum opened soon after.

Collections
The Brenham Heritage Museum has acquired the body of her collections from the citizenry of Brenham, Texas and the surrounding Washington County. A number of groups and organizations have provided the museum with significant portions of the collection:

 Washington County
 City of Brenham
 The Brenham Fire Department
 Roberta Cole Johnson
 Edwina Day Hallstein
 Honorable Judge Eddie Harrison
 The Kaminsky and Murski families
 The families of Washington County

Collections by category
 Historic Images of Brenham and Washington County
 Furniture
 Militaria
 Oral History
 Tools
 Objects related to the commerce and businesses of Washington County
 Historic Structures

Museum structure as a heritage site
The Brenham Heritage Museum is located in what was once the US Post Office for the City of Brenham. The building was constructed between 1914 (when the land was first acquired) and 1916 (when construction was completed).  It remained the post office until the mid-1960s, when a new post office was built nearby.  The old post office structure became a federal office building.

Listed on the National Register of Historic Places in 1990, it was added due to its notable Classical Revival architecture.

References 

Brenham Post Office construction Site. Brenham Heritage Museum. Black and White Photograph, 1914.

Property Abstract for 200 block of South Market Street. Brenham Heritage Museum. 1910 and 1914.

Board Minutes. Brenham Heritage Museum. 1990 and 1991.

External links 
 Brenham Heritage Museum official site

Museums in Washington County, Texas
History museums in Texas
Buildings and structures in Brenham, Texas
Post office buildings on the National Register of Historic Places in Texas
National Register of Historic Places in Washington County, Texas